Rowendy Wendy José Sumter (born 19 March 1988) is a Curaçaoan footballer who plays goalkeeper for RKSV Scherpenheuvel in the Sekshon Pagá and for the Curaçao national team.

Club career

Jong Holland
Born in Willemstad, Netherlands Antilles, Sumter began his career with CRKSV Jong Holland in the Sekshon Pagá, the highest level of football in Curaçao. He has been the first choice goalkeeper since his first season with the club, with his performance earning him caps with the national team.

Atlétiko Flamingo
In January 2016, Sumter moved to Atlétiko Flamingo Bonaire based out of Nikiboko, Bonaire and competing in the Bonaire League, helping the club to win their first national championship for the 2015–16 season.

Scherpenheuvel
In the Summer of 2016, Sumter returned to Curaçao, joining RKSV Scherpenheuvel competing in the Curaçao League First Division once more.

International career
Sumter plays for the national team of Curaçao. He made his debut on 19 August 2012 in a friendly match against the Dominican Republic, the first official match of the national team after the dissolution of the Netherlands Antilles, ending in a 1–0 loss. On 6 September 2011 he played in the 2014 FIFA World Cup qualification match against Haiti which ended in a 4–2 loss, failing to advance in the qualifiers. He was the first choice keeper for the 2012 Caribbean Cup qualification matches against Saint Lucia, Guyana and Saint Vincent and the Grenadines. He was also called up by Patrick Kluivert for the 2018 FIFA World Cup qualification, as second choice keeper behind Eloy Room.

Career statistics

International performance
Statistics accurate as of matches played on 25 October 2012,

Honours

Club
Atlétiko Flamingo
 Bonaire League (1): 2015–16

International
Curaçao
 Caribbean Cup: 2017

References

External links

1988 births
Living people
People from Willemstad
Curaçao footballers
Curaçao international footballers
Sekshon Pagá players
CRKSV Jong Holland players
Association football goalkeepers
2017 CONCACAF Gold Cup players
Curaçao under-20 international footballers
Curaçao youth international footballers
SV Atlétiko Flamingo players
RKSV Scherpenheuvel players